Harold J. Brubaker is a Republican politician who served in the North Carolina General Assembly. He represented the state's seventy-eighth House district, including constituents in Randolph County, for 35 years. He resigned in 2012 with plans to become a lobbyist. At the time he was the longest-serving sitting member of the House.

He was born and grew up in Lancaster County, Pennsylvania.

Brubaker was Speaker of the House for two terms (1995–1998). He was the only Republican Speaker in North Carolina in the twentieth century, the first Republican speaker since Zeb V. Walser (1895) and the first non-Democrat to be speaker since Populist A. F. Hileman (1897).

A real estate appraiser and cattle breeder from Asheboro, North Carolina, Brubaker was first elected to the House in 1976 and in 2011 became chairman of the House Appropriations Committee.

He is a board member and chairman emeritus of the American Legislative Exchange Council (ALEC).

Election history
2010

Controversies
In 1989, the New York Times reported that Brubaker was paid $10,000 to assist developers in Durham, North Carolina, regarding a real estate project that drew scrutiny from authorities. The project involved converting a hosiery mill into homes for the elderly, and caused concern when subordinates had reportedly been against the project, but funds were appropriated nevertheless.

References

External links
 

|-

|-

|-

Living people
Republican Party members of the North Carolina House of Representatives
Speakers of the North Carolina House of Representatives
1946 births
21st-century American politicians